Quantum engineering is the development of technology that capitalizes on the laws of quantum mechanics. Quantum engineering uses quantum mechanics as a toolbox for the development of quantum technologies, such as quantum sensors or quantum computers.

There are many devices available which rely on quantum mechanical effects and have revolutionized society through medicine, optical communication, high-speed internet, and high-performance computing, just to mention a few examples. Nowadays, after the first quantum revolution that brought us lasers, MRI imagers and transistors, a second wave of quantum technologies is expected to impact society in a similar way. This second quantum revolution makes use of quantum coherence and capitalizes on the great progress achieved in the last century in understanding and controlling atomic-scale systems. It is expected to help solve many of today's global challenges and has triggered several initiatives and research programs all over the globe. Quantum mechanical effects are used as a resource in novel technologies with far-reaching applications, including quantum sensors and novel imaging techniques, secure communication (quantum internet) and quantum computing.

Education programs 
Quantum engineering is evolving into its own engineering discipline. The quantum industry requires a quantum-literate workforce, a missing resource at the moment. Currently, scientists in the field of quantum technology have mostly either a physics or engineering background and have acquired their ”quantum engineering skills” by experience. A survey of more than twenty companies aimed to understand the scientific, technical, and “soft” skills required of new hires into the quantum industry. Results show that companies often look for people that are familiar with quantum technologies and simultaneously possess excellent hands-on lab skills.

Several technical universities have launched education programs in this domain. For example, ETH Zurich has initiated a Master of Science in Quantum Engineering, a joint venture between the electrical engineering department (D-ITET) and the physics department (D-PHYS), and the University of Waterloo has launched integrated postgraduate engineering programs within the Institute for Quantum Computing. Similar programs are being pursued at Delft University, Technical University of Munich, MIT, CentraleSupélec and other technical universities.

Students are trained in signal and information processing, optoelectronics and photonics, integrated circuits (bipolar, CMOS) and electronic hardware architectures (VLSI, FPGA, ASIC). In addition, they are exposed to emerging applications such as quantum sensing, quantum communication and cryptography and quantum information processing. They learn the principles of quantum simulation and quantum computing, and become familiar with different quantum processing platforms, such as trapped ions, and superconducting circuits. Hands-on laboratory projects help students to develop the technical skills needed for the practical realization of quantum devices, consolidating their education in quantum science and technologies.

See also 

 Quantum supremacy
 Noisy intermediate-scale quantum era
 Timeline of quantum computing and communication

References 

Emerging technologies
Engineering disciplines
Quantum mechanics